Alec Mawhinney (1 December 1894 – 5 March 1967) was an Australian rules footballer who played for the Melbourne Football Club in the Victorian Football League (VFL).

After leaving Melbourne, Mawhinney played for Healesville in 1923.

Notes

External links 
		
 

1894 births
1967 deaths
Australian rules footballers from Victoria (Australia)
Melbourne Football Club players